Mahatma Gandhi Institute of Technology (MGIT) is a technological institution (Autonomous) located in Gandipet, Hyderabad, Telangana, India. It was started in 1997 by the Chaitanya Bharathi Educational Society (CBES), Hyderabad, registered under the Societies Registration Act. The annual intake is 900 students at the undergraduate level and 108 students at the postgraduate level. The institute is affiliated with Jawaharlal Nehru Technological University, Hyderabad (JNTUH), The institute has Autonomous Status till 2021-2031 A.Y. granted by UGC and offers a four-year Bachelor of Technology, in eleven disciplines and two-year Master of Technology, in six disciplines prescribed by JNTU. The college is accredited by the National Board of Accreditation and is ISO 9001:2000 certified

Rankings 
 MGIT ranks #6 among all colleges in Telangana by EDU ZO3 College ranking 2020(https://edu.zo3.in/ts-college-list/ecet) 
 Ranks #49 among the "Top Engineering Colleges of Excellence in India" according to Competition Success Review CSR-GHRDC Engineering Colleges Survey 2012 (http://ghrdc.org/pdfs/3%20EnggOverall_Result2012.pdf).
 MGIT ranks #95 among the "Top Engineering Colleges in India"  according to The Week (Indian magazine) 
 MGIT ranks #32 among the "Top Engineering Colleges in South India" according to Deccan Chronicle
 Also has excellent ratings in surveys conducted by Careers 360, Sakshi, etc.

Executive leadership 
 Chairman - Sri Praveen D Reddy
 Board Secretary - Sri J. Pratap Reddy
 Principal - Dr. G ChandraMohan Reddy

Courses 
The institute offers a four-year Bachelor's degree Bachelor of Technology [BTECH], in eleven disciplines:
 Computer Science Engineering (CSE)
Computer Science Engineering - Data Science (CSD)
Computer Science Engineering - Artificial Intelligence and Machine Learning (CSM)
Computer Science and Business Systems (CSB)
 Information Technology (INF)
 Electrical and Electronics Engineering (EEE)
 Electronics and Communication Engineering (ECE)
 Mechanical Engineering (Mechatronics) (MCT)
 Metallurgy and Materials Engineering (MME)
 Civil Engineering (CIV)
 Mechanical Engineering (MEC)

The institute offers a two-year master's degree Master of Technology [MTECH], in four departments:
 Mechatronics (MCT)
 Computer Networks & Information Security (CSE)
 Digital Electronics & Communication Engineering(ECE)(From academic year 2012–2013)
 Power Electronics & Electrical Drives(EEE)(From academic year 2012–2013)
 Computer Aided Structural Engineering
 Software Engineering

Every semester has a minimum of eight courses, which includes a minimum of two laboratory courses. Students are required to attain a total of 216 of the possible 224 credits and attend the institute for the duration of not less than four years and not more than eight years to be considered for the award of the degree. The institute follows JNTU's attendance regulation, which requires students to put in a minimum class attendance of 65% to progress to the next semester. External (university) exams are held every semester on the campus and consolidated results in all these exams count towards the final aggregate grading.

Admissions 
The minimum criterion for admission is 60% marks in the Intermediate/10+2 Examination. Students are admitted primarily based on their ranks in the Engineering Agricultural and Medical Common Entrance Test EAMCET, held by the JNTUH every year. It also takes lateral entry admissions based on TS ECET ranks.

Departments 
The institute has ten departments:

 Department of Mechanical Engineering (Mechatronics) 

 Department of Metallurgy and Materials Technology     
 Department of Information Technology
 Department of Computer Science and Engineering         
 Department of Electrical and Electronics Engineering    
 Department of Electronics and Communication Engineering 
 Department of Mathematics and Humanities
 Department of Physics and Chemistry
 Department of Physical Education
 Department of Civil Engineering (started in 2010)
 Mechanical Engineering(MECH) (from the academic year 2012–2013)

Department Heads and Faculty 
 Department of Civil : Dr. K.V. Ramana Reddy (Head of the Department) and 18 Assistant Professors 
 Department of Computer Science and Engineering : C. Ramesh Kumar Reddy (Head of the Department), 2 Professors,3 Sr Assistant Professors and 30 Assistant Professors

Annual Fests 
Nirvana is organized by MGIT in March every year. It started in 2004. Musicians and DJs are invited to perform at the show.
 2005 - Zero (Indian band) and Pin Drop Violence
 2006 - Strings (band)
 2007 - Prayag – Rock Band
 2008 - Pritam
 2009 - Motherjane and Junkyard Groove
 2010 - Krishnakumar Kunnath
 2011 - Ryan Beck (DJ)
 2014 - Mika Singh  official website nirvana 2014
 2015 - Sravana Bhargavi
 2016 - Sundeep Kishan
 2017 - Saina Catherine 
 2018 - Chandra Bose(Writer)
 2020 - Ramajogayya Sastry , Answer Music(DJ)

Department Events 

 MAGISTECH is an event organized by ISTE Students’ Chapter-MGIT which is held annually on 15 and 16 September. The event provides a platform for engineering students to interact and share their ideas with other students across the country. The themes of the paper presentation competition cover the entire spectrum of engineering and technology. Other major events include the Robotics competition and Tantra (a design competition in which a problem statement is given). This event is conducted as part of the celebrations of Engineers’ Day, the birthday of "Bharath Ratna Sir Mokshgundam Visvesvaraya".

 QUBIT is the annual technical fest of the Department of Computer Science. It is a prestigious technological event in the state with papers presented from all over the country. It has risen beyond its technical reach and incorporated cultural aspects with the introduction of LAN-Gaming, Treasure Hunts, Fun Stalls, etc. giving it an all-round reach. It is organized during the month of March right from the year of its inception without fail. It is a technical symposium for young minds and a meeting ground for tech-enthusiasts from around the country.

  MICROCOSM is the annual technical fest of the Department of Electronics and Communication Engineering.

 POTENZIA is the annual technical fest of Department of Electrical and Electronics Engineering.

 TECHNOVATION is the annual technical fest of the Department of Mechanical Engineering (Mechatronics).

 YUKTI is the annual technical fest of the Department of Information Technology.

 METALLON is the annual technical fest of the Department of Metallurgy and Materials Technology.

 CINFRA is the annual technical fest of the Department of Civil Engineering.

External links 
 MGIT Autonomous Status news article in  Telangana Today
 Mahatma Gandhi Institute of Technology
 Jawaharlal Nehru Technological University
 Mika Singh in MGIT Nirvana 2014

 Universities and colleges in Hyderabad, India
 Educational institutions established in 1997
1997 establishments in Andhra Pradesh